Sidão official name Sidnei Dos Santos Jr. (born 1982), commonly known as Sidão is a Brazilian volleyball player, who competes for SESI São Paulo and the national team. He competed at the 2012 Summer Olympics, where Brazil lost in the final. He was part of the Brazil men's national volleyball team at the 2010 FIVB Volleyball Men's World Championship in Italy. He played for Taubaté Funvic.

Clubs
 Taubaté Funvic (2010)

Sporting achievements

Clubs
 2005/2006  Brazilian Superliga, with Cimed Florianópolis
 2010/2011  Brazilian Superliga, with SESI São Paulo

International trophies
 2007/2008  CEV Challenge Cup – with Modena Volley
 2011  South American  Club Championship – with SESI São Paulo

Individuals
 2005–06 Brazilian Superliga – Best Server
 2010–11 Brazilian Superliga – Best Server
 2013 South American Championship – Best Middle Blocker
 2013 South American Championship – Most Valuable Player

References 

1982 births
Living people
Brazilian men's volleyball players
Volleyball players at the 2012 Summer Olympics
Olympic silver medalists for Brazil
Olympic medalists in volleyball
Olympic volleyball players of Brazil
Medalists at the 2012 Summer Olympics
Middle blockers